Liaqat Ali Khan (born May 21, 1955 in Karachi, Sindh) is a former Pakistani cricketer who played in 5 Tests and 3 ODIs from 1975 to 1978. He played 173 First-Class Matches. he had taken 489 wickets in 173 matches.

He made his Test debut against West Indies at Karachi.Score Card

And played his last match against England at Lord's. Score Card

References

1955 births
Living people
Liaqat Ali
Liaqat Ali
Liaqat Ali
Liaqat Ali
Liaqat Ali
Liaqat Ali
Pakistani cricketers
Cricketers from Karachi
Karachi Greens cricketers
Karachi Blues cricketers
Karachi Whites cricketers
Sind A cricketers